Saint-Avé is a commune in the Morbihan department of Brittany in north-western France. It's the 8th most populated commune of the Morbihan department and the 32nd of the Brittany region with its population of 11,787 inhabitants in 2018.

Located just north of the bigger city of Vannes, it is part of the Gulf of Morbihan regional natural reserve.

The name of the town is a francization of the Breton name Sant-Teve.

Demographics
Inhabitants of Saint-Avé are called in French Avéens.

Climate
In 2020, the town was classified as having an “oceanic climate” type using the classification established by Météo-France, which only has five main types of climates for mainland France. This type of climate is characterised by mild temperatures and relatively abundant rainfall (in conjunction with disturbances from the Atlantic), distributed throughout the year with a slight maximum from October to February.

Breton language
The municipality launched a linguistic plan through Ya d'ar brezhoneg on 25 March 2005.

In 2008, there was 15.35% of the children attended the bilingual schools in primary education.

See also
Communes of the Morbihan department

References

External links

Official website 

 Mayors of Morbihan Association 

Saintave